Field hands were slaves who labored on plantations. They were commonly used to plant, tend, and harvest cotton, sugar, rice, and tobacco.

Chores 
Field slaves usually worked in the fields from sunrise to sundown while being monitored by an overseer. The overseer ensured that enslaved people did not slow down or cease their field work until the day was over.

Clothing 
Enslavers gave field slaves one outfit annually. During the winter time, enslavers may have given field slaves additional clothing or material to make other cloth to keep warm.

Children 
Enslaved children did not go to school and had to work as young as possible. Enslavers gave younger children lighter tasks, like fetching meals and guarding livestock. Enslavers provided enslaved children little to no clothing until they reached puberty.

Women 
Enslavers gave enslaved women long dresses to wear in the summer. During the winter, enslaved women made themselves shawls and pantalettes. Enslaved women often wore turbans on their heads, covering their hair.

Men 
Enslavers gave enslaved men pants to wear in the summer and long coats in winter.

Meals 
Enslavers gave field slaves weekly rations of food, including meat, corn, and flour. If enslavers permitted, enslaved people could have a garden to grow themselves fresh vegetables. Otherwise, they could only make a meal from their rations and anything else they could find.

See also
Field holler
House negro
Treatment of the enslaved in the United States

References

Slavery in the United States
Plantations in the United States